The 1801 New York gubernatorial election was held in April 1801 to elect the Governor and Lieutenant Governor of New York.

Candidates
The Democratic-Republican Party nominated state assemblyman and former Governor George Clinton. They nominated former U.S. representative and president of the Bank of Albany Jeremiah Van Rensselaer for Lieutenant Governor.

The Federalist Party nominated Lieutenant Governor Stephen Van Rensselaer. They nominated former U.S. senator James Watson for Lieutenant Governor.

Results
The Democratic-Republican ticket of Clinton and Jeremiah Van Rensselaer was elected.

Sources
Result: The Tribune Almanac 1841

See also
New York gubernatorial elections
New York state elections

1801
New York
Gubernatorial
April 1801 events